General Viamonte Partido is a partido in the north of Buenos Aires Province in Argentina.

The town of Los Toldos is home to an Indigenous Mapuche colony.

Name
The partido was originally named after a settlement that had built up around a train station on the Buenos Aires Western Railway called Los Toldos. In 1910 the name of the partido was changed from Los Toldos to General Viamonte although the town has kept the name Los Toldos.

The partido is now named in honour of General Juan José Viamonte, a hero of the Argentine War of Independence, governor of Buenos Aires and Argentine head of state for 3 days (April 18, 1815 to April 20, 1815).

There is some debate about the name of the district capital: some sources claim that the capital is also known as General Viamonte, but the population of the district still call it Los Toldos.

Settlements
Los Toldos
Baigorrita
Chancay
La Delfina
Quirno Costa
San Emilio
Zavalía

External links
 information about Los Toldos

1908 establishments in Argentina
Partidos of Buenos Aires Province
Populated places established in 1908